Culcua is a genus of flies in the family Stratiomyidae.that are found only in the Indomalayan realm. About eleven species have been described. They have a disc-shaped flagellum to the antenna and have a arista or hair arising from it. The scutellum typically has four strong spines and the abdomen is nearly spherical

Species
Culcua albopilosa (Matsumura, 1916)
Culcua angustimarginata Yang, Zhang & Li, 2014
Culcua argentea Rozkošný & Kozánek, 2007
Culcua chaineyi Rozkošný & Kozánek, 2007
Culcua fasciata Rozkošný & Kozánek, 2007
Culcua immarginata Yang, Zhang & Li, 2014
Culcua kolibaci Rozkošný & Kozánek, 2007
Culcua kovaci Rozkošný & Kozánek, 2007
Culcua longispina Yang, Zhang & Li, 2014
Culcua nigra Brunetti, 1924
Culcua normani Rozkošný & Kozánek, 2007
Culcua ornans Rozkošný & Kozánek, 2007
Culcua simulans Walker, 1856

References

Stratiomyidae
Brachycera genera
Taxa named by Francis Walker (entomologist)
Diptera of Asia